In enzymology, an anthranilate adenylyltransferase is an enzyme that catalyzes the chemical reaction

ATP + anthranilate  diphosphate + N-adenylylanthranilate

Thus, the two substrates of this enzyme are ATP and anthranilate, whereas its two products are diphosphate and N-adenylylanthranilate.

This enzyme belongs to the family of transferases, specifically those transferring phosphorus-containing nucleotide groups (nucleotidyltransferases).  The systematic name of this enzyme class is ATP:anthranilate N-adenylyltransferase. This enzyme is also called anthranilic acid adenylyltransferase.

References

 

EC 2.7.7
Enzymes of unknown structure